
Year 200 (CC) was a leap year starting on Tuesday (link will display the full calendar) of the Julian calendar. At the time, it was known as the Year of the Consulship of Severus and Victorinus (or, less frequently, year 953 Ab urbe condita). The denomination 200 for this year has been used since the early medieval period, when the Anno Domini calendar era became the prevalent method in Europe for naming years.

Events

By place

World 
 Human population reaches about 257 million.

Roman Empire 
 Emperor Septimius Severus visits the provinces of Syria, Palestine, and Arabia.
 The province of Numidia is taken from the African proconsul, and made an Imperial province.

India 
 Rudrasena I, Saka ruler of the Western Satrap dynasty, becomes king of Malwa in Classical India.

China 
 September-November - Battle of Guandu: Chinese warlord Cao Cao defeats his rival Yuan Shao.

Japan 
 In Japan, Himiko, whose capital is situated in Yamatai, extends her authority over a number of clans.

America 
 The Classic Age of Maya civilization begins (around this year).
 The Paracas culture in the Andes ends (around this year).

By topic

Art 
 The Severan Tondo, depicting Septimius Severus, Julia Domna and their children Geta and Caracalla, from Fayum, Egypt, is made. It is now kept at Staatliche Museen zu Berlin, Preussischer Kulturbesitz, Antikensammlung.

Religion 
 Jewish Eretz Yisraeli scholar Judah ha-Nasi compiles tracts of the Mishnah, creating Talmudic law.
 Clement of Alexandria denounces the use of musical instruments instead of human voices in Christian music.
 Brahmanism evolves into Hinduism (approximate date).

Births 
 Cyprian, Roman bishop and writer (d. 258) 
 Diophantus, Greek mathematician and writer 
 Marcus Claudius Tacitus, Roman emperor (d. 276)
 Novatian, Roman antipope and theologian (d. 258)
 Valerian I, Roman emperor (d. 260/264)
 Zhang Changpu, Chinese concubine (d. 257)

Deaths 
 Gan Ji, Chinese Taoist priest and writer
 Ju Shou, Chinese adviser and politician
 Quintus Aemilius Saturninus, Roman prefect
 Sun Ce, Chinese general and warlord (b. 175)
 Tian Feng, Chinese official, adviser and politician
 Xu Gong, Chinese official, administrator and warlord 
 Zheng Xuan, Chinese philosopher and writer (b. 127)
 Emperor Chūai of Japan, according to legend.

References